Walter Hollington "Bill" London (30 June 1904 – 1 February 1968) was a former Australian rules footballer who played with Melbourne in the Victorian Football League (VFL).

Football

Sandringham (MAFA)
Recruited from the Sandringham Juniors Football Club that competed in the B Grade of the Metropolitan Amateur Football Association (MAFA) in 1928.

Cricket

Death
He died at the Spencer Hospital, in Wynyard, Tasmania, on 1 February 1968.

Notes

References

External links 
 
 Bill London, at Demonwiki

1904 births
Australian rules footballers from Victoria (Australia)
Melbourne Football Club players
Sandringham Football Club players
1968 deaths